Antony Henry Head, 1st Viscount Head,  (19 December 1906 – 29 March 1983) was a British soldier, Conservative politician and diplomat.

Background and education
Head was the son of Geoffrey Head and Ethel Daisy, daughter of Arthur Flower. He was educated at Ludgrove School, Eton and the Royal Military College, Sandhurst.

Military career
A career soldier, Head was commissioned a second lieutenant in the 15th/19th The King's Royal Hussars on 30 August 1926. He later joined the Life Guards, serving through the Second World War and achieving the rank of brigadier. He was awarded the Military Cross (MC) on 20 December 1940.

Political career
Head was elected Conservative MP for Carshalton in 1945. He served as Secretary of State for War from 1951 to 1956 and as Minister of Defence (with a seat in the cabinet) from 1956 to 1957, in the administrations of Winston Churchill and Anthony Eden. He was sworn of the Privy Council in 1951 and in 1960 he was raised to the peerage as Viscount Head, of Throope in the County of Wiltshire. He was later High Commissioner to Nigeria from 1960 to 1963 and High Commissioner to Malaysia from 1963 to 1966. He was knighted as a Knight Commander of the Order of St Michael and St George (KCMG) in the 1961 New Year Honours and promoted to be Knight Grand Cross (GCMG) in 1963.

Family
Lord Head married Lady Dorothea Louise (29 April 1907 – 1987), daughter of Anthony Ashley-Cooper, 9th Earl of Shaftesbury, on 23 July 1935. They had four children:

Richard Antony Head, 2nd Viscount Head (b. 27 February 1937)
Teresa Mary Head (b. 20 June 1938)
Simon Andrew Head (b. 11 November 1944)
Josephine Head (24 May 1948 – 9 October 1949)

Lord Head died in March 1983, aged 76, and was succeeded in the viscountcy by his eldest son, Richard.

Arms

References

Kidd, Charles, Williamson, David (editors). Debrett's Peerage and Baronetage (1990 edition). New York: St Martin's Press, 1990.

External links 
Generals of World War II
  

15th/19th The King's Royal Hussars officers
1906 births
1983 deaths
British Army brigadiers of World War II
British Life Guards officers
Head, Anthony
Commanders of the Order of the British Empire
Conservative Party (UK) MPs for English constituencies
Graduates of the Royal Military College, Sandhurst
High Commissioners of the United Kingdom to Malaysia
High Commissioners of the United Kingdom to Nigeria
Knights Grand Cross of the Order of St Michael and St George
Members of the Privy Council of the United Kingdom
Ministers in the Eden government, 1955–1957
Officers of the Order of St John
People educated at Eton College
Recipients of the Military Cross
UK MPs 1945–1950
UK MPs 1950–1951
UK MPs 1951–1955
UK MPs 1955–1959
UK MPs 1959–1964
UK MPs who were granted peerages
Viscounts created by Elizabeth II
People educated at Ludgrove School